Cao Buxing was a painter of the state of Eastern Wu during the Three Kingdoms period of Chinese history. He lived in Wuxing (in present-day Zhejiang). His name is sometimes written as Cao Fuxing (曹弗興). He excelled in painting dragons, tigers and human figures.

Notes

References
Chen Shou. Records of Three Kingdoms, Chapter 63.
Barnhart, R. M. et al. (1997). Three thousand years of Chinese painting. New Haven, Yale University Press. 
Ci hai bian ji wei yuan hui (辞海编辑委员会）. Ci hai （辞海）. Shanghai: Shanghai ci shu chu ban she （上海辞书出版社）, 1979.

Eastern Wu painters